Molalan (also, Mulalan) is a village and municipality in the Lerik Rayon of Azerbaijan.  It has a population of 1,035.

References 

Populated places in Lerik District